Jess & Matt are a pop music duo consisting of husband and wife Jess Dunbar and Matt Price. They started out as solo artists but became a duo in 2014.

Career

2015: The X Factor
In 2015, Jess & Matt auditioned for season seven of The X Factor Australia singing "Georgia" by Vance Joy. They made it to the Grand Final and were mentored by Guy Sebastian, ultimately coming third behind Cyrus Villanueva and Louise Adams.

 denotes a performance that entered the ARIA Singles.
 denotes having been in the bottom two.

2016–2017: Jess & Matt and Belmont Street

Immediately after The X Factor 2015, Jess & Matt signed with Sony Music Australia and released their would-have-been winners single "Nothing Matters". It debuted and peaked at number 29. They released their debut self-titled album in December, which featured studio re-recorded tracks of some of their performances on the show. It peaked at number 9. In July 2016, they released "Bones".

On 25 January 2017, Jess & Matt released "Sydney to Me" to coincide with their Australia Day concert performance. An EP Belmont Street was released on 10 February 2017.

2018: Songs from the Village and wedding

In June 2018, the duo released their second studio album Songs from the Village which peaked at number 11 on the ARIA charts.

On 8 September, 2018, the duo married in the Hunter Valley.

In October, they were part of the 100 judges on All Together Now.

2019–present: Independent Artists and Wildflowers
In 2019, the duo left Sony and in November 2019, the duo released their first independent single, "Know About You", with the video premiering in January 2020.

In June 2021, the duo announced the released of their third studio, and first of original music, titled Wildflowers released on 9 July 2021.

Discography

Albums

Extended plays

Singles

Other charting singles

References

External links
 

2014 establishments in Australia
Musical groups established in 2014
Sony Music Australia artists
The X Factor (Australian TV series) contestants